The 2000 Missouri Valley Conference men's basketball tournament was played after the conclusion of the 1999–2000 regular season at the Kiel Center in St. Louis, Missouri.

The Creighton Bluejays defeated the Southwest Missouri State Bears in the championship game, 57–45, and as a result won their 6th MVC Tournament title and earned an automatic bid to the 2000 NCAA tournament. Ryan Sears of Creighton was named the tournament MVP.

Tournament Bracket

See also
 Missouri Valley Conference

References 

1999–2000 Missouri Valley Conference men's basketball season
Missouri Valley Conference men's basketball tournament
2000 in sports in Missouri
College basketball tournaments in Missouri
Basketball competitions in St. Louis